Agema is a surname. Notable people with the surname include:

David Agema (born 1949), American politician
Fleur Agema (born 1976), Dutch politician and former spatial designer
Sueddie Agema, Nigerian poet, editor, and literary administrator